Lucerne Peak is located on the border of Alberta and British Columbia; on the continental divide, and is one of the peaks of Yellowhead Mountain. It was named by Arthur O. Wheeler after the railway town located at the mountain's base.

When the Canadian Northern Pacific Railway reached Yellowhead Lake in 1913, it named the station there after Lucerne, Switzerland. A small town developed. For a time it had a population approaching three hundred and rivaled Jasper. In 1924 the "railway divisional point" moved from Lucerne to Jasper and many of the residents relocated to Jasper. Lucerne's railway station was demolished after the Second World War.

Climate

Based on the Köppen climate classification, Lucerne Peak is located in a subarctic climate zone with cold, snowy winters, and mild summers.

See also
 List of peaks on the Alberta–British Columbia border
 Mountains of Alberta
 Mountains of British Columbia

References

Lucerne Peak
Lucerne Peak
Canadian Rockies